Darko Jozinović (born 15 August 1970) is a retired Croatian footballer and most recently manager of HNK Cibalia.

References

External links

Darko Jozinović at Glas Slavonije

1970 births
Living people
Footballers from Osijek
Association football midfielders
Croatian footballers
HNK Cibalia players
HNK Hajduk Split players
Karlsruher SC players
NK Hrvatski Dragovoljac players
NK Samobor players
NK Vinogradar players
NK HAŠK players
NK Lučko players
NK Sesvete players
Croatian Football League players
Bundesliga players
First Football League (Croatia) players
Croatian expatriate footballers
Expatriate footballers in Germany
Croatian expatriate sportspeople in Germany
Croatian football managers
NK Rudeš managers
HNK Cibalia managers